Lithobius obscurus is a species of centipede in the Lithobiidae family. It was first described in 1872 by Danish arachnologist Frederik Vilhelm August Meinert.

Distribution
The species has a cosmopolitan distribution. The type locality is Carratraca, in Malaga, Spain.

Subspecies
 Lithobius obscurus azoreae Eason & Ashmole, 1992
 Lithobius obscurus mediocris Eason & Ashmole, 1992
 Lithobius obscurus obscurus Meinert, 1872

Behaviour
The centipedes are solitary terrestrial predators that inhabit plant litter and soil.

References

 

 
obscurus
Centipedes of Australia
Fauna of New South Wales
Myriapods of Europe
Arthropods of Africa
Arthropods of South America
Animals described in 1872
Taxa named by Frederik Vilhelm August Meinert
Cosmopolitan arthropods